Karel Janež (22 January 1914 – April 2006) was a Slovenian gymnast. He competed at the 1948 Summer Olympics and the 1952 Summer Olympics.

References

1914 births
2006 deaths
Slovenian male artistic gymnasts
Olympic gymnasts of Yugoslavia
Gymnasts at the 1948 Summer Olympics
Gymnasts at the 1952 Summer Olympics
Sportspeople from Ljubljana